William Cochran McCauslen (1796March 13, 1863) was an American lawyer and politician who served for one term as a U.S. Representative from Ohio for one term from 1843 to 1845.

Early life and career 
McCauslen was born near Steubenville in the Northwest Territory (in what is now Ohio), and attended the public schools. After he studied law, he was admitted to the bar and practiced in Steubenville. He was a law partner of Secretary of War Stanton. He served as member of the State house of representatives in 1829, 1830, 1832, and 1833. He owned and edited a Democratic newspaper in Steubenville.

Congress 
McCauslen was elected as a Democrat to the Twenty-eighth Congress (March 4, 1843 – March 3, 1845).

Later career and death 
McCauslen was commissioned on August 31, 1846, during the Mexican War as a captain and commissary of subsistence of the Third Regiment, Ohio Infantry. He was honorably discharged June 24, 1847. He died in Steubenville, Ohio, March 13, 1863 and was interred in Union Cemetery.

Sources

1796 births
1863 deaths
Politicians from Steubenville, Ohio
United States Army officers
Burials at Union Cemetery-Beatty Park
Ohio lawyers
Democratic Party members of the Ohio House of Representatives
19th-century American newspaper publishers (people)
American military personnel of the Mexican–American War
19th-century American politicians
Journalists from Ohio
19th-century American lawyers
Democratic Party members of the United States House of Representatives from Ohio